This is a chronological list of significant or pivotal moments in the development of Native American art or the visual arts of the Indigenous peoples of the Americas. Earlier dates, especially before the 18th century, are mostly approximate.

Before common era
 33,950–15,050 BCE: Artists paints hundreds of images at Serra da Capivara, Piauí, in northeastern Brazil.
 12,800–8,500 BCE: Artists etch the Winnemucca Lake petroglyphs, near Reno, Nevada.
 11,000 BCE: Megafauna bone etched with a profile image of a walking mammoth and cross-hatched designs left near Vero Beach, Florida is the oldest known portable art in the Americas
 10,000–7000 BCE: "Horny Little Man," a petroglyph depicting a stick figure with an oversized phallus, is carved in Lapa do Santo, a cave in central-eastern Brazil, is the oldest reliably dated rock art in the Americas.
 9250–8950 BCE: Clovis points - thin, fluted projectile points created using bifacial percussion flaking - are created by Clovis culture peoples in the Plains and Southwestern North America
1914: Louisa Keyser, Washoe basket maker, experiences peak of her fame
1915: Iñupiaq men invent baleen basketry
1916: In a controversial move, Navajo weaver Hastiin Klah (1867–1937) incorporates Yeibichei imagery into a rug
1917: Quechua photographer Martín Chambi establishes his own photography studio in Peru
1917–1930s: Seminole women in Florida develop their unique patchwork appliqué designs
1918: Julian Martinez (San Ildefonso Pueblo) invents the matte-on-glossy blackware ceramic technique
1920s: The Kwakwaka'wakw Four (Chief George, Charley George, Sr., Willie Seaweed, and George Walkus) collaborate to revive and modernize Kwakwaka'wakw art
1922: Social Indigenist movement begins in Peru and thrives for three decades
1922: First Santa Fe Indian Market held, sponsored by the Museum of New Mexico
1925: Native Arts department of the Denver Art Museum was founded 
1926: Indigenist Movement formed in Ecuador by Camilo Egas, Oswaldo Guayasamín, and other Quechua and Mestizo artists
1927: First Nations art exhibited with Euro-Canadian art in the Exhibition of the Canadian West Coast Art in the National Gallery of Canada in Ottawa
1928: Kiowa Six participate in the International Art Congress in Prague, Czech Republic
1931: Exposition of Indian Tribal Arts opens at the Grand Central Art Galleries in New York City. Sponsored by the Commissioner of Indian Affairs, the Secretary of the Interior, and the College Art Association, the exhibition of over 600 artworks then toured the Venice Biennale.
1932: Kiowa Six participate in the Venice Biennale. Their art, according to Dorothy Dunn, "was acclaimed the most popular exhibit among all the rich and varied displays assembled."
1932: Professor Mary Stone McClendon "Ataloa" (Chickasaw, 1895–1967) founds the Ataloa Art Lodge, a Native American art center at Bacone College, in Muskogee, Oklahoma
1932: The Studio at the Santa Fe Indian School is established by Dorothy Dunn
1933–34: Century of Progress Exposition, better known as the Chicago World's Fair features Native artists such as Navajo artists Fred Peshlaikai, Ah-Kena-Bah, and Hastiin Klah, as well as Maria and Julian Martinez, who won Best in Show.
1934: Arts and Crafts of the Indians of the Southwest opens at the DeYoung Museum in San Francisco
1934–1941: The Seneca Indian Arts Project, a WPA-funded project at the Rochester Museum and Science Center, headed by Arthur C. Parker (Seneca), hires 70 Haudenosaunee artists to create almost 6,000 artworks
1936: Indian Arts and Crafts Board created in the US
1938: Osage Nation establishes the oldest tribal museum in Pawhuska, Oklahoma
1939: Many Native artists participate in the 1939 New York World's Fair including realist landscape painter Moses Stranger Horse (Brulé Lakota, 1890–1941) and Fort Sill Apache sculptor Allan Houser (1914–1994)
1939: Hopi artist Fred Kabotie curates a Native American art show at the Golden Gate International Exposition in San Francisco
1941: Indian Art of the United States exhibition shows at the Museum of Modern Art, New York City
1946: Qualla Arts and Crafts is founded on the Qualla Boundary in North Carolina by Eastern Band Cherokee artists, becoming the first arts and crafts cooperative founded by Native Americans in the US
1948: Allan Houser completes his first monumental sculpture at the Haskell Indian School in Lawrence, Kansas
1950s and 1960s: Maya weaving cooperatives established by the Mexican government
1957: West Baffin Eskimo Co-op Ltd., an Inuit graphic arts workshop, is founded by James Archibald Houston in Cape Dorset, Nunavut.
1958: Yanktonai Dakota artist Oscar Howe (1915–1983) writes his famous letter after his work was rejected from the Philbrook Museum art show for not being "Indian" enough
1958: Heard Museum Guild hosts their first annual Indian Fair and Market in Phoenix, Arizona
1958–1962: Norval Morrisseau (Ojibwe) develops Woodlands Style painting in Ontario
1960: Oscar Howe appears on an episode of This Is Your Life, Ralph Edwards Productions, NBC, 13 April 1960. The guest host was Vincent Price. Among the surprise guests was Howe's former teacher, Dorothy Dunn.
1962: The Institute of American Indian Arts is founded in Santa Fe, New Mexico
1965: University of Alaska, Fairbanks creates their Native Art Center
1967: Fritz Scholder paints Indian No. 1, 1967, Oil paint on canvas, 20 x 18 in, the first of his famed Indian series paintings.
1967: Red Cloud Indian School in Pine Ridge, South Dakota hosts its first annual juried, competitive, intertribal art show which continues today
1971: The Cherokee Heritage Center in Park Hill, Oklahoma hosts the first Trail of Tears art show, an annual juried, competitive, intertribal art show which also continues today
1971: The Institute of American Indian Arts Museum (now called the Museum of Contemporary Native Arts) is founded by the Institute of American Indian Arts in Santa Fe, as the only museum to focus on contemporary intertribal Native American art
1972: Two American Painters shows at the Smithsonian Institution's National Collection of Fine Arts in Washington, DC, featuring T. C. Cannon (Kiowa/Caddo) and Fritz Scholder (Luiseño)
1977: Sna Jolobil (House of the Weaver) in San Cristobal de Las Casas, Mexico becomes the first artist-run Mayan weaving cooperative
1990: Native American Graves Protection and Repatriation Act passed in the US
1990: American Indian Arts and Crafts Act passed in the US
1992: Crow's Shadow Institute of the Arts, a center for fine printmaking, is founded by Walla Walla artist James Lavadour on the Umatilla Indian Reservation.
1992: Eiteljorg Museum hosts their first annual Indian Market and Festival
1995: Edward Poitras (Plains Cree) represents Canada at the Venice Biennale, with Gerald McMaster (Plains Cree) curating.
1999: Native American Arts Alliance, curated by Nancy Mithlo (Chiricahua Apache) sponsors Native American artists Harry Fonseca, Bob Haozous, Jaune Quick-to-See Smith, Kay WalkingStick, Frank LaPena, Richard Ray Whitman, and poet Simon Ortiz in the Venice Biennale
2000: Mapuche printmaker Santos Chávez is granted the Altazor award and named "illustrious son" of Tirúa, Chile

21st century
2004: National Museum of the American Indian opens its doors in Washington, DC
2005: Rebecca Belmore (Anishinaabe) represents Canada and James Luna (Luiseño) represents NMAI at the Venice Biennale.
2006: Chile hosts its first Biennial of Indigenous Art and Culture in Santiago, featuring over 120 artists from Chile's nine indigenous groups.
2006: The first Bienal Intercontinental de Arte Indigena (Intercontinental Indigenous Arts Biennial) is held in Quito, Ecuador
2009: Pottery by Jereldine Redcorn (Caddo), who singlehandedly revived her tribe's ceramic tradition, is exhibited in the Oval Office of the White House
2022: Cynthia Chavez Lamar is appointed the new director of the National Museum of the American Indian, and is the first Native American woman to serve as a Smithsonian museum director.

See also

Archaeological sites in Peru
Cultural periods of Peru
Indigenous art of the Americas
Indigenous ceramics of the Americas
List of indigenous artists of the Americas
Mesoamerican chronology
Native American Jewelry
Pre-Columbian art

Notes

References
 Bement, Leland C. Bison hunting at Cooper site: where lightning bolts drew thundering herds. Norman: University of Oklahoma Press, 1999. .
 Berlo, Janet C. and Ruth B. Phillips. Native North American Art. Oxford: Oxford University Press, 1998: 97-8. .
 Downs, Dorothy. Art of the Florida Seminole and Miccosukee Indians. Gainesville: University Press of Florida. .
 Dunn, Dorothy. American Indian Painting of the Southwest and Plains Areas. Albuquerque: University of New Mexico Press, 1968. ASIN B000X7A1T0.
 Fane, Diana, ed. Converging Cultures: Art & Identity in Spanish America. New York: Harry N. Abrams, 1996. .
 Greene, Candace S. and Russel Thornton, ed. The Year the Stars Fell: Lakota Winter Counts at the Smithsonian. Washington, DC: Smithsonian Institution, 2007. 
 Hessel, Ingo. Arctic Spirit: Inuit Art from the Albrecht Collection at the Heard Museum. Phoenix: Heard Museum, 2006. .
 Josephy, Alvin M., Jr. The Indian heritage of America. Boston: Mariner Books, 2001. .
 Libhart, Myles. Contemporary Sioux Painting. Rapid City, SD: Indian Arts and Crafts Board, 1970. ASIN B001Y46FHS.
 McFadden, David Revere and Ellen Napiura Taubman. Changing Hands: Art without Reservation 2: Contemporary Native North American Art from the West, Northwest and Pacific. New York: Museum of Arts and Design, 2005. .
Penny, David W. North American Indian Art. London: Thames and Hudson, 2004. .
 Seymour, Tryntje Van Ness. When the Rainbow Touches Down. Phoenix, AZ: Heard Museum, 1988. .
 Silverman, Helaine and William Isbell, eds. Handbook of South American Archaeology. New York: Springer Publishing, 2008. .
Swan, Daniel C. Peyote Religious Art: Symbols and Faith and Belief. Jackson: University of Mississippi Press, 1999. .
Stone-Miller, Rebecca. Art of the Andes: from Chavín to Inca. London: Thames and Hudson, 2002. .
 Tsinhnahjinnie, Hulleah J. and Veronica Passalacqua, eds. Our People, Our Land, Our Images: International Indigenous Photography. Berkeley: Heyday Books, 2008. .
Wolfe, Rinna Evelyn. Edmonia Lewis: Wildfire in Marble. Parsippany, New Jersey, 1998. 

 
 
Art history
Native American
Native American
Native American Art
Art history
Art by year
Native American history